Biyi Bandele (born Biyi Bandele-Thomas; 13 October 1967 – 7 August 2022) was a Nigerian novelist, playwright and filmmaker. He was the author of several novels, beginning with The Man Who Came in From the Back of Beyond (1991), as well as writing stage plays, before turning his focus to filmmaking. His directorial debut was in 2013 with Half of a Yellow Sun, based on the 2006 novel of the same name by Chimamanda Ngozi Adichie.

Early life 
Bandele was born to Yoruba parents in Kafanchan, Kaduna State, Nigeria, in 1967. His father Solomon Bandele-Thomas was a veteran of the Burma Campaign in World War II, while Nigeria was still part of the British Empire. In a 2013 interview with This Day, Bandele said of his ambitions to become a writer: "When I was a child, I remembered war was something that sprang up a lot in conversations on the part of my dad. ... That was probably one of the things that turned me into a writer." When he was 14 years old he won a short-story competition.

Bandele spent the first 18 years of his life in the north-central part of the country, later moving to Lagos, then in 1987 he studied drama at Obafemi Awolowo University, Ile-Ife, having already begun work on his first novel. He won the International Student Playscript competition of 1989 with an unpublished play, Rain, before claiming the 1990 British Council Lagos Award for a collection of poems.

He moved to London in 1990, at the age of 22, armed with the manuscripts of two novels. In 1991, his debut novel The Man Who Came in From the Back of Beyond was published, followed by The Sympathetic Undertaker: and Other Dreams, and he was given a commission by the Royal Court Theatre. In 1992, he was awarded an Arts Council of Great Britain writers bursary to continue his writing.

Career

Writing
Bandele's writing encompassed fiction, theatre, journalism, television, film and radio.

He worked with the Royal Court Theatre, the Royal Shakespeare Company, as well as writing radio drama and screenplays for television. His plays include: Rain; Marching for Fausa (1993); Resurrections in the Season of the Longest Drought (1994); Two Horsemen (1994), selected as Best New Play at the 1994 London New Plays Festival; Death Catches the Hunter and Me and the Boys (published in one volume, 1995); and Oroonoko, an adaptation of Aphra Behn's 17th-century novel of the same name. In 1997, Bandele did a successful dramatisation of Chinua Achebe's Things Fall Apart. Brixton Stories, Bandele's stage adaptation of his own novel The Street (1999), premiered in 2001 and was published in one volume with his play Happy Birthday Mister Deka, which premiered in 1999. He also adapted Lorca's Yerma in 2001.

Bandele was writer-in-residence with Talawa Theatre Company from 1994 to 1995, resident dramatist with the Royal National Theatre Studio (1996), the Judith E. Wilson Fellow at Churchill College, University of Cambridge, in 2000–01. He also acted as Royal Literary Fund Resident Playwright at the Bush Theatre from 2002 to 2003.

Bandele has written of the impact on him of John Osborne's Look Back in Anger, which he saw on a hire-purchase television set in a railway town in northern Nigeria: 

Bandele's novels, which include The Man Who Came in from the Back of Beyond (1991) and The Street (1999), have been described as "rewarding reading, capable of wild surrealism and wit as well as political engagement". His 2007 novel, Burma Boy, reviewed in The Independent by Tony Gould, was called "a fine achievement" and lauded for providing a voice for previously unheard Africans.

Bandele had been working on a new novel, entitled Yorùbá Boy Running, to be published in 2023.

Filmmaking 
His directorial debut film, Half of a Yellow Sun – based on the 2006 novel of the same name by Chimamanda Ngozi Adichie – was screened in the Special Presentation section at the 2013 Toronto International Film Festival (TIFF), and received a "rapturous reception". The film received a wide range of critical attention.

He also directed the third season of the popular MTV drama series, Shuga, which aired in 2013.

His 2015 film, entitled Fifty, was included in the London Film Festival.

In 2022, he directed the first Netflix Nigerian Original series Blood Sisters.

Bandele directed the Netflix and Ebonylife TV co-production Elesin Oba, The King's Horseman, the screen adaptation of Wole Soyinka's stage play Death and the King's Horseman, which premiered at Toronto International Film Festival in September 2022. Characterised by Variety as a "passion project" for the director, Elesin Oba, The King's Horseman was "the first-ever Yoruba-language film to premiere at TIFF in the Special Presentation category, and then onto Netflix".

Other work
There were plans by galleries in London and New York to exhibit Bandele's photographs of street life in  Lagos.

Death 
Bandele died in Lagos on 7 August 2022 at the age of 54. The cause of death has not been confirmed. His funeral took place on 23 September.

Bibliography 
The Man Who Came in From the Back of Beyond, Bellew, 1991
The Sympathetic Undertaker: and Other Dreams, Bellew, 1991
Marching for Fausa, Amber Lane Press, 1993
Resurrections in the Season of the Longest Drought, Amber Lane Press, 1994
Two Horsemen, Amber Lane Press, 1994
Death Catches the Hunter/Me and the Boys, Amber Lane Press, 1995
Chinua Achebe's Things Fall Apart (adaptation), 1999
Aphra Behn's Oroonoko (adaptation), Amber Lane Press, 1999
The Street, Picador, 1999
Brixton Stories/Happy Birthday, Mister Deka, Methuen, 2001
Burma Boy, London: Jonathan Cape, 2007. Published as The King's Rifle in the US and Canada (Harper, 2009).

Filmography 
 Half of a Yellow Sun – feature film, 2013
 Fifty – feature film, 2015
 Shuga – television series, Season 3 (Shuga Naija), 2013 
 Blood Sisters – Netflix Nigerian Original series, 2022
 Elesin Oba, The King's Horseman – Ebonylife TV / Netflix co-production, feature film, 2022

Awards
1989 – International Student Playscript Competition – Rain
1994 – London New Play Festival – Two Horsemen
1995 – Wingate Scholarship Award
2000 – EMMA (BT Ethnic and Multicultural Media Award) for Best Play – Oroonoko

References

External links
 The International Student Playscript Competition
 Biyi Bandele-Thomas  at Doollee.com: The Playwrights Database
 "Writers: Biyi Bandele", The British Council
 Encompass Books
 Interview with Koye Oyedeji, BBC, Africa Beyond.
 Al Jazeera English: "Interview: Biyi Bandele", YouTube.
 Biyi Bandele at the Berlin International Literature Festival 2003
 "100 African Writers Celebrate Biyi Bandele’s Life and Work", Brittle Paper, 15 August 2022.

1967 births
2022 deaths
20th-century male writers
20th-century Nigerian novelists
21st-century male writers
21st-century Nigerian novelists
Black British filmmakers
Black British writers
Fellows of Churchill College, Cambridge
Filmmakers from Lagos
Nigerian dramatists and playwrights
Nigerian entertainment industry businesspeople
Nigerian expatriates in the United Kingdom
Nigerian film directors
Nigerian male novelists
Nigerian screenwriters
Obafemi Awolowo University alumni
People from Kaduna State
Yoruba dramatists and playwrights
Yoruba filmmakers